WPSU (91.5 FM) is central Pennsylvania's only National Public Radio member radio station licensed to the Pennsylvania State University Board of Trustees as a part of WPSU Penn State. The over-the-air and digital signal reaches 13 counties in central and north central Pennsylvania. The station is rebroadcast on WPSX 90.1 FM in Kane. Both the 91.5 and 90.1 signals transmit in HD.

Its production facilities are located along Innovation Park Boulevard outside State College.

With transmitters located throughout the region, WPSU-FM now serves over 450,000 listeners  in 13 central counties of the Commonwealth, 24 hours a day.

Through nationally and locally produced news, features and music programs from NPR, PRI and the station itself, WPSU-FM offers a variety of programming for a widely diverse listening audience.

History
The station went on the air December 6, 1953 as WDFM.  It was first conceived by the Class of 1951 and given to the University as a class gift. The primary goal of WDFM was to provide a hands-on learning experience for students interested in radio communications, but it also strove to serve the community with unique programming. A faculty member from the College of Communications served as a hands-on manager and full-time adviser.  The radio station enjoyed quite a bit of popularity (and even controversy) in its early days, with certain DJs (including future faculty adviser Robert Zimmerman) opting to play cutting-edge artists such as Elvis Presley when doing so was not widely deemed acceptable.  In the early days of WDFM the station was limited to jazz and classical music, but Zimmerman staged call-ins and requests to allow a wider variety of music to be featured.  According to Lauren Deutsch, a Journalism major who serve in various roles from 1965 - 1969, DJs were limited to play only jazz, folk, Broadway musicals, and Western early and classical music under an agreement with the commercial radio stations in State College and the region. Thus, no rock music was heard until around 1970. According to Scott Hower, a Radio TV major who was a DJ and the Chief Engineer from 1971 - 1974, rock was played in the evenings starting around 1970. A morning oldies format was aired from 6 - 10 am starting around 1971. Rock music, plus the fact that WDFM was in stereo, was a thorn in the side of at least one of the State College commercial radio stations (which did not upgrade to stereo until around 1972). The DJ's on that commercial station were forbidden from working at WDFM.

The station also presented live talk shows, including those with live and taped interviews of performing artists appearing on campus at the time. According to Deutsch, who served as assistant director of News as well as who anchored a Broadway show tune and other cultural programs, the news was gathered from the AP wire machine at the station. (On occasion the national / international news would be missing from the wire, likely taken by someone with a current events project due, and the newscast would be limited to the agricultural report. This "problem" was not a great loss to the listeners studying in that area.

One of the challenges of any noncommercial station is to raise funds. During the mid 1960, according to Deutsch, the WDFM staff would sell FM transistor radios for this purpose. This was a great idea inasmuch as this broadcast mode was relatively new technology.

On August 19, 1984, the station picked up the WPSU call letters, a year after the radio station at Penn State Wilkes-Barre, which had held them, was shuttered in 1983. WPSU became a part of Penn State Public Media under the university's Department of Continuing and Distance Education as opposed to being affiliated with the College of Communications, and is now a unit of Penn State Outreach.

Starting in the mid-1980s, as faculty involvement increased and student involvement decreased, WPSU-FM began syndicating NPR shows to an area where NPR hadn't previously been available.  Such programming increased markedly from the late 1980s through the early 1990s. Finally, by 1992, WPSU-FM was a full-fledged NPR affiliate.

WPSU-FM provides student internship experiences through reporting assignments and on-air hosting, as well as has many community volunteer on-air hosts.

Internet

Live streaming
WPSU-FM's signal is streamed across the Internet 24-hours a day.

Podcasts
WPSU-FM also has podcasts of the following programs:
 WPSU Morning News
 WPSU Weekly Features
 BookMark
 Penn State Forum
 Take Note Radio
 WPSU's Story Corps

Relationship with WKPS
When it signed on in December 1953, WPSU-FM was the student station for Penn State under the call letters WDFM. In the mid 1990s, a new station and signal was created—WKPS—that became the full-time student station. WKPS operates independently from WPSU-FM. WPSU-FM provides engineering and technical consultation, and development underwriting sales to support WKPS's efforts.

Simulcast

Translators

See also
 WPSU-TV - a PBS TV station
 WKPS - The Lion 90.7FM - Penn State Student Radio
 WPSE - Penn State Erie's Money Station

References

External links
 

 

NPR member stations
Classical music radio stations in the United States
PSU
Radio stations established in 1953